Hecatera fixseni is a species of moth of the family Noctuidae. It is found in Egypt, Israel, Armenia, Iran, Turkmenistan, Afghanistan and Pakistan.
 
Adults are on wing from March to April in Israel, generally, it is a bivoltine species, flying in spring and autumn.

External links
 Hadeninae of Israel

Hecatera
Moths of the Middle East
Moths described in 1883